Charles Monson (c. 1695 - 26 August 1764) was a British politician who served in the Parliament of Great Britain between 1734 and 1754.

Early life and education
Monson was born around 1695. He graduated from Pembroke College, Cambridge on 11 February 1713.

Political career
Monson first attempted to run for parliament in 1728, but was defeated. He ran again in 1734 and was successful. In 1737 he was appointed Deputy Paymaster of the Forces with an annual salary of 1000 pounds. He was re-elected to parliament in 1741, and he resigned his deputy paymaster position in 1746, because it had become inconsistent with a seat in the House of Commons under the Place Act of 1742. He was re-elected to his final term in 1747, and he retired in 1754.

Death
Monson died on 26 August 1764.

References

1695 births
1764 deaths
17th-century English politicians